Clifford Franklin Battles (May 1, 1910 – April 28, 1981) was an American professional football player who was a halfback in the National Football League (NFL). Battles was inducted into the Pro Football Hall of Fame in 1968.

Early life
Battles was born in Akron, Ohio, the son of Frank Battles, a saltworker for the BFGoodrich and Firestone tire companies, and Della Battles.  He played high school football at Kenmore High School.  Kenmore today honors athletes who carry on Battles' tradition, those who letter in three sports their senior year, with the Cliff Battles Award. Kenmore High School is at the corner of 13th Street and Battles Avenue, but the avenue is not named after Cliff. It was so named before he became famous.

College career
Battles attended and played college football at West Virginia Wesleyan College.  His most prominent season was 1931, when he scored 15 touchdowns and had four extra points.  The best game of his college career was also in 1931 in a game against Salem College, when he scored seven touchdowns and had 354 rushing yards, 91 kick return yards, and 24 receiving yards, totalling 469.

He acquired the nickname "Gip" (sometimes spelled "Gipp") because of his admiration for Notre Dame back George Gipp, the subject of Knute Rockne's "win one for the Gipper" speech.

While at West Virginia Wesleyan, Battles won 15 letters in five sports – four each in football and track, three each in baseball and basketball, and one in tennis.  While there, he was a Phi Beta Kappa scholar and Rhodes Scholarship candidate.

He was named to the West Virginia Hall of Fame in 1950 and the College Football Hall of Fame in 1955.

While at West Virginia Wesleyan, Battles also played semipro football for the South Akron Awnings under the name of Jones.

Professional career
After college, Battles got many offers from NFL teams including the New York Giants and Portsmouth Spartans, among other NFL teams. But he signed with the Boston Braves (now the Washington Commanders) in 1932, who offered him $175 per game, compared with a high of $150 from the other teams.

In 1932, Battles won the NFL's rushing title as a rookie.  He also performed well during the 1933 season and on October 8, 1933, Battles, playing for the newly named Boston Redskins, became the first player to exceed 200 rushing yards in a game, finishing with 215 yards on 16 rushes and one touchdown against the Giants.

In 1937, the Redskins moved from Boston to Washington, D.C. and acquired quarterback Sammy Baugh.  For the 1937, Baugh and Battles combined their talents just as everyone had anticipated.  During their last regular-season game, Battles scored three touchdowns and the Redskins beat the Giants for the Eastern Division title.  In the 1937 NFL Championship against the Chicago Bears a week later, Battles scored the first touchdown in a 28–21 victory that gave the Redskins their first NFL title.

In what would end up being his last regular-season game on December 5, 1937, Battles ran for 165 yards against the Giants at the Polo Grounds.  This was the record for most rushing yards for a player in the final regular-season game of his NFL career until Tiki Barber broke the record on December 30, 2006, with 234 rushing yards.

In the 1937 NFL season, Battles was again the league's leading rusher with 874 yards on 216 carries and won all-league honors for the fifth time in six years.  In six seasons, Battles totaled 3,511 yards rushing. A two way threat, he also finished his career with 15 interceptions, including one returned for a touchdown.

After 1937, Battles hoped for a raise in salary.  George Preston Marshall, the owner of the Redskins, refused to pay him more than $3,000 a year (the amount Battles had been paid since his rookie season).  Battles chose retirement instead, and left the game as a player at the end of 1937.

Coaching career
After the 1937 season, Cliff Battles accepted a $4,000 job as an assistant football coach at Columbia University coached there from 1938 to 1943.  While at Columbia, Battles was also the head coach of the men's basketball team from 1942 to 1943. He then served in the United States Marine Corps during World War II.  After the war, Battles became head coach of the Brooklyn Dodgers of the All-America Football Conference from 1946 to 1947.

After football
After the end of his coaching career, Battles became an associate with General Electric in the Washington Metropolitan Area before retiring in 1979.  He died on April 28, 1981 in Clearwater, Florida, and is buried in Parklawn Memorial Park in Rockville, Maryland.

References

Further reading

External links

 
 
 

1910 births
1981 deaths
Basketball coaches from Ohio
American football halfbacks
United States Marine Corps personnel of World War II
Boston Braves (NFL) players
Boston Redskins players
Brooklyn Dodgers (AAFC) coaches
College Football Hall of Fame inductees
Columbia Lions football coaches
Columbia Lions men's basketball coaches
El Toro Flying Marines football coaches
Pro Football Hall of Fame inductees
Washington Redskins players
West Virginia Wesleyan Bobcats baseball players
West Virginia Wesleyan Bobcats basketball players
West Virginia Wesleyan Bobcats football players
West Virginia Wesleyan Bobcats tennis players
College men's track and field athletes in the United States
Sportspeople from Clearwater, Florida
Players of American football from Akron, Ohio
Death in Florida
Burials at Parklawn Memorial Park
Coaches of American football from Ohio
American men's basketball players